Hylesinus is a genus of crenulate bark beetles in the family Curculionidae. There are more than 180 described species in Hylesinus.

See also
 List of Hylesinus species

References

Further reading

External links

 

Scolytinae
Articles created by Qbugbot